Thirty Years Later, is a 1928 American black and white silent drama film directed and produced by Oscar Micheaux for Micheaux Films. Thirty Years Later film was based on Henry Francis Downing' The Racial Tangle. The film stars William Edmonson and Mabel Kelly in the lead roles, whereas A.B. DeComathiere, Ardelle Dabney and Gertrude Snelson made supportive roles. The film revolves on the love affair between George Eldridge Van Paul, the son of a white father and a black mother, and Hester Morgan, a black girl.

Unfortunately the film is presumed lost without any evidence of reels.

Cast
 William Edmonson as George Eldridge Van Paul
 Mabel Kelly as Hester Morgan
 A.B. DeComathiere as Habisham Strutt
 Ardelle Dabney as Clara Booker
 Gertrude Snelson as Mrs. Van Paul
 Barrington Carter		
 Madame Robinson		
 Arthur Ray		
 Ruth Williams

References

External links 
 

1928 films
American silent films
Lost American films
1920s American films